David Vincour (born 14 March 1984, in Brno) is a Czech former competitive ice dancer. Skating with Kamila Hájková, he became a five-time Czech national champion and competed at the 2010 Winter Olympics.

Career 
Vincour began skating at age five, stopped until he was 12, then took up ice dancing and competed for Austria with Sabine Pichler and Barbara Herzog. He then competed with Kamila Hájková for the Czech Republic. The two are the 2006-2010 Czech national champions and the 2005 Ondrej Nepela Memorial bronze medalists. 

During the 2006–07 season, Vincour was hospitalized for an extended period due to intestinal problems and underwent surgery and, as a result, they missed the World Championships. After the 2009–10 season, they decided to take some time off from competition and Vincour began skating in shows.

Programs

With Hájková

With Herzog

Competitive highlights
GP: Grand Prix; JGP: Junior Grand Prix

With Hájková for the Czech Republic

With Herzog for Austria

With Pichler for Austria

References

External links 

 
 Official website of Hájková and Vincour

Navigation

Czech male ice dancers
Austrian male ice dancers
Czech expatriate sportspeople in Austria
Figure skaters from Brno
1984 births
Living people
Figure skaters at the 2010 Winter Olympics
Olympic figure skaters of the Czech Republic
Competitors at the 2009 Winter Universiade